Inge Schneider may refer to:

 Inge Schneider-Gabriel, German rower
 Inge Schneider (film editor) (1947–2021) German film editor